Bukovina u Čisté is a municipality and village in Semily District in the Liberec Region of the Czech Republic. It has about 200 inhabitants.

History
The first written mention of Bukovina u Čisté is from 1386. The village was then known under the name Bukovinka. In 1628, Albrecht von Wallenstein acquired Bukovina from Karel Kapoun of Svojkov. He also purchased other manors in the surrounding area and together they were later attached to his Hostinné estate. However, Wallenstein was assassinated in Cheb in 1634 and his vast properties were confiscated.

Over the years, Bukovina had many owners, but in 1850 it became an independent municipality. In 1873, the settlement Karlov was founded by Karel of Morzin and came under administration of Čistá. In 1927 the settlement merged with Hájenka hamlet and nine houses in Čistá, and they were joined to Bukovina. This enlarged municipality became known as Bukovina u Čisté.

Sights
There is several well-preserved timbered cottages in the municipality. The house no. 20 is protected as a cultural monument.

References

Villages in Semily District